Rielasingen-Worblingen is a municipality in the district of Konstanz, in Baden-Württemberg, Germany. It is situated on the border with Switzerland, 4 km south of Singen, and 20 km east of Schaffhausen. This town is twinned with the French town of Nogent-sur-Seine in the Aube department and the Italian city of Ardea.

Rielasingen-Worblingen has five kindergartens, three elementary schools and two secondary schools.

References

Konstanz (district)